was the pen-name of , a Japanese tanka poet and novelist active during the Meiji period of Japan.

Biography
Itō was born in what is now Sanmu city, Chiba prefecture, as the younger son to a farming family. He attended the Meiji Hōritsu gakko (the predecessor of Meiji University), but left without graduating.

His interest in poetry led him to visit the famous author Masaoka Shiki, who accepted him as a student. Itō established the literary magazine Araragi in 1903, and served as its editor until 1908. During this time, he published his poems, literary criticism and studies on the Man'yōshū. He published a sentimental love story, Nogiku no haka ("The Wild Daisy", 1906) in the literary magazine Hototogisu. The story became a popular classic, and was made into movies in 1955, 1966 and in 1981.

Itō came to be regarded as Masaoka Shiki's closest disciple with the posthumous publication of his tanka anthology Sachio kashu in 1920. His own disciples included Saitō Mokichi and Tsuchiya Bunmei (:ja:土屋文明).

In addition to his literary career, Itō was also an amateur master of the Japanese tea ceremony. He died of a cerebral hemorrhage.

See also
Japanese literature
List of Japanese authors

References
Fujioka, Takeo. Seimei no sakebi Ito Sachio. Shintensha (1983). 
Ito, Sachio. Songs of a Cowherd;: Translated from the works of Sachio Ito (Modern Japanese poets series). Marshall Jones Company (1936). ASIN: B000861F8W

External links
 
 
 
e-texts of works at Aozora Bunko (in Japanese)
Sammu City Museum site  (in Japanese)

1864 births
1913 deaths
People from Sanmu
Writers from Chiba Prefecture
19th-century Japanese novelists
People of Meiji-period Japan
20th-century Japanese poets